Nawayug Academy Higher Secondary School is a secondary school in Inaruwa, Sunsari District, Nepal.

References

Secondary schools in Nepal
Sunsari District